Sharek or Shalek could have been a poorly known ancient Egyptian pharaoh during the Second Intermediate Period of Egypt.

Attestation
He is only attested on a non-contemporary document, a genealogy of a priest named Ankhefensekhmet who lived at the end of the 22nd Dynasty – thus several centuries after Sharek's supposed reign; perhaps for this reason, Danish Egyptologist Kim Ryholt doubts his existence. On the document, Sharek is placed one generation before the well-known Hyksos pharaoh Apepi of the 15th Dynasty. The genealogy of Ankhefensekhmet is now exhibited at the Neues Museum in Berlin (inv. no. 23673).

Identification
Both Nicolas Grimal and William C. Hayes have proposed that Sharek should be identified with a king named Salitis, given as the founder of the Hyksos 15th Dynasty in Manetho's Aegyptiaca, a history of Egypt written in the 2nd century BC. They further propose that Sharek/Salitis is the same person as Sheshi, a ruler during Egypt's Second Intermediate Period mentioned on nearly 400 scarab seals.

References

17th-century BC Pharaohs
Pharaohs of the Fifteenth Dynasty of Egypt
Second Intermediate Period of Egypt
People whose existence is disputed